Aristide Bahin (born 21 November 1987 in Dabou) is an Ivorian footballer who plays as a forward. He played in the Portuguese Liga de Honra for Trofense.

Club career

References

External links 
 

Living people
1987 births
Ivorian footballers
Association football forwards
Stella Club d'Adjamé players
Bnei Sakhnin F.C. players
C.D. Trofense players
US Créteil-Lusitanos players
Expatriate footballers in Israel
Expatriate footballers in Portugal
Expatriate footballers in France
Ivorian expatriates in Israel
Ivorian expatriates in France
Israeli Premier League players
People from Lagunes District

Ivorian expatriate sportspeople in Portugal